The diplomatic post of United States Ambassador to East Timor (now Timor-Leste) was created after the formalization of the independence of Timor-Leste from Indonesia on May 20, 2002. The United States recognized the new nation immediately, and an embassy was opened in Dili.

Ambassadors

See also
East Timor–United States relations
Foreign relations of East Timor
Ambassadors of the United States

References

United States Department of State: Background notes on East Timor

External links
 
 Chiefs of Mission for Timor-Leste

East Timor

United States